Gustav Fuchs  (January 2, 1900 - March 31, 1969) was a German politician, representative of the Christian Social Union of Bavaria and Bavarian People's Party. He represented Bad Kissingen in the Bundestag from 1949 to 1961. Between 1964 and 1969 he was a member of the Bavarian Senate.

See also
List of Bavarian Christian Social Union politicians

1900 births
1969 deaths
Bavarian People's Party politicians
Members of the Bundestag for Bavaria
Members of the Bundestag 1957–1961
Members of the Bundestag 1953–1957
Members of the Bundestag 1949–1953
Members of the Bavarian Senate
Members of the Bundestag for the Christian Social Union in Bavaria